Quzlu (also Romanized as Qūzlū; also known as Tūzlū) is a village in Ani Rural District, in the Central District of Germi County, Ardabil Province, Iran. At the 2006 census, its population was 222, in 47 families.  Quzlu lies on the Mughan plain; the people are Muslim and speak in Azerbaijani language.

Etymology

The name Quzlu (Oghuzlu/Ghozlu/Qozlu) comes from Oghuz Turks. An alternative theory about the etymology of this name is because the place has many walnut trees and walnut in Azeri and Persian language is called Qoz and Joz, then the name of the place means the place with many walnut trees.

Population 
Qozlu in 1987, 1992 and 1997 respectively had 403, 375 and 295 inhabitants. In 2007, it had 222  inhabitants.

References 

Towns and villages in Germi County